Motherwell West is one of the twenty-one wards used to elect members of the North Lanarkshire Council. It elects three councillors and covers parts of Motherwell lying west of the Argyle Line and Cumbernauld line railways, including the Forgewood, Greenacres, Ladywell and North Motherwell neighbourhoods, with a population of 14,256 in 2019; created in 2007, its boundaries remained unchanged in a 2017 national review.

Councillors

Election Results

2022 Election

2017 Election
2017 North Lanarkshire Council election

2012 Election
2012 North Lanarkshire Council election

2007 Election
2007 North Lanarkshire Council election

References

Wards of North Lanarkshire
Motherwell